Rekha Waheed (née Waheed;is an English novelist and writer of Bangladeshi descent. She has written four novels including 2004's The A-Z Guide to Arranged Marriage, and 2010's Saris and the City and My Bollywood Wedding.

Early life
Rekha Waheed was born in Shepherd's Bush, London, England to parents of Bangladeshi origin. She completed her MSc in Economic Development at the School of Oriental and African Studies, University of London.

Whilst pursuing her passion for writing she travelled the world as a corporate consultant. However, she soon caught the attention of a literary agent delivering public readings at the Harrow Writers' club.

Career
In October 2005, Waheed's debut novel The A-Z Guide to Arranged Marriage was published by Monsoon Press. In April 2010, her second novel Saris and the City was published by Little Black Dress, followed by her third novel Adam Akbar – Master of Poverty by Perfect Publishers in June 2010, and then her fourth novel My Bollywood Wedding by Little Black Dress in December 2010. Waheed's natural writing style is first-person narrative. Her distinct style has been described as "bridging the gap between old world traditions with new world savvy".

In June 2005, Waheed co-founded Monsoon Press Publisher with Rabina Khan. Through Monsoon Press, she works with the Arts Council and Penguin to raise the profile of British Ethnic and Muslim literature. She has previously worked as a columnist for Bangla Mirror and sat on the board of Women in Publishing. In addition, she has worked voluntarily as a treasurer for a Bengali community organisation. She is currently represented by MBA Literary Agency.

In 2006, Waheed read at the London Literacy Event. In 2007, she read at the Spitalfields Literacy Event. In 2006, she was cited by Asian Woman magazine as one of the "Faces to Watch" and one of the fastest rising British Asians in media. She is regular guest on BBC Asian Network, women's programmes, and literary and social events to debate social issues affecting British Asians in the west.

Personal life
Waheed is a Muslim.

Novels

See also
 British Bangladeshi
 List of British Bangladeshis
 List of English writers
 List of Muslim writers and poets

References

External links
 Rekha Waheed on Myspace
 Rekha Waheed on British Bangladeshi Who's Who
 Monsoon Press website
 Rahman, Emdad. The book launch that bridged the diversity divide. CyberSylhet. November 2005
 Shaikh, Farhana. Rekha Waheed. The Asian Writer. 8 February 2011

1975 births
Living people
English Muslims
English people of Bangladeshi descent
English women novelists
English columnists
British women columnists
Muslim writers
British Asian writers
21st-century English writers
21st-century English women writers
Bangla Mirror people
Writers from London
People from Shepherd's Bush
Alumni of SOAS University of London
English women non-fiction writers